Jenaya Wade-Fray (born 5 September 1988, Spectacle Island) is a Bermudian basketball player for Great Britain women's national basketball team. She was part of the squad for the 2012 Summer Olympics.

References

1988 births
Living people
British women's basketball players
Basketball players at the 2012 Summer Olympics
Olympic basketball players of Great Britain